Anton Hans Jörg Linhart (24 July 1942 – 12 May 2013) was an Austrian football player who later started a successful career in American football in the U.S.

Career
Linhart was born in Donawitz, now part of Leoben, Austria.  He played association football for Wiener Sportclub in the Austrian Bundesliga and also for the Austria national football team.

In 1972 he moved to the US and joined the New Orleans Saints in the National Football League as a placekicker. He spent most of his NFL career with the Baltimore Colts. Linhart was voted into the Pro Bowl twice, and was the NFL's leading scorer in 1976. Toni Linhart is one of only three Austrians who have played in the NFL, the other two being Ray Wersching and Toni Fritsch, also placekickers in the 1970s.

Linhart started the 1979 season with the Baltimore Colts, but was cut after playing 3 games. The New York Jets signed him before week 8 to fill in for the injured Pat Leahy. On 11 November 1979, the Jets lost to the Buffalo Bills 14-12 – the difference coming from two missed extra points by Linhart. The following week, Linhart missed an extra point and a field goal in a 23-13 Jets loss to the Chicago Bears. He never played in the NFL again after this.

On 12 May 2013, Toni Linhart died in Timonium, Maryland, aged 70.

References

External links
 
 
 

1942 births
2013 deaths
People from Leoben
Austrian footballers
Austria international footballers
Austrian Football Bundesliga players
American football placekickers
Baltimore Colts players
New Orleans Saints players
New York Jets players
American Conference Pro Bowl players
Austrian players of American football
Austrian emigrants to the United States
Footballers who switched code
Association football defenders
Wiener Sport-Club players
First Vienna FC players
Footballers from Styria